Holden is a town in Millard County, Utah, United States.  The population was 378 at the 2010 census.

History
Holden was settled in 1855 by a group of ten families sent out by the bishop of the local congregation of The Church of Jesus Christ of Latter-day Saints in Fillmore. Named Cedar Springs for the springs in the junipers that the community was built around. The town then assumed the name Buttermilk Fort because travelers passing through were encouraged to stop for a glass of cold buttermilk while resting. The town got its post office in 1864, and the town was renamed for Elijah E. Holden, a member of the Mormon Battalion who was one of the first settlers of Holden and died while caught in a snowstorm in 1858.

Geography
According to the United States Census Bureau, the town has a total area of 0.6 square mile (1.4 km2), all land.

Demographics

As of the census of 2000, there were 400 people, 140 households, and 105 families residing in the town. The population density was 728.7 people per square mile (280.8/km2). There were 162 housing units at an average density of 295.1 per square mile (113.7/km2). The racial makeup of the town was 99.50% White, and 0.50% from two or more races. Hispanic or Latino of any race were 1.00% of the population.

There were 140 households, out of which 40.0% had children under 18 living with them, 65.0% were married couples living together, 10.0% had a female householder with no husband present, and 25.0% were non-families. 24.3% of all households were made up of individuals, and 17.1% had someone living alone who was 65 years of age or older. The average household size was 2.86, and the average family size was 3.47.

In the town, the population was spread out, with 34.0% under 18, 6.3% from 18 to 24, 20.0% from 25 to 44, 22.5% from 45 to 64, and 17.3% who were 65 years of age or older. The median age was 36 years. For every 100 females, there were 91.4 males. For every 100 females aged 18 and over, there were 83.3 males.

The median income for a household in the town was $34,000, and the median income for a family was $42,083. Males had a median income of $43,571 versus $16,250 for females. The per capita income for the town was $14,024. About 5.5% of families and 7.9% of the population were below the poverty line, including 8.5% of those under age 18 and 6.9% of those aged 65 or over.

Economy

The traditional economy has been agriculture. Before the freeway, I-15, bypassed the town, there were five gas stations, a grocery store, a cafe, a swimming pool, an open-air dance hall, and a show house. Those businesses are now gone. Now there is a dental office with two dentists, a UPS transfer station where packages are delivered throughout Millard County, a nursery that grows native plants, three beauticians, a cabinet shop, a realty business, and several home businesses featuring craft items. Cattle, alfalfa hay, and corn are the main agricultural products. Most of the farms are located outside of the city limits, but they are owned and operated by farmers and ranchers that live in Holden.

Primary employers in the area are Intermountain Community Hospital, Intermountain Power Project (IPP), Brush Wellman, Sunrise Engineering, the Great Lake Cheese Company of Utah, Mountain View Mushrooms, and the Kern River Gas Transmission.

See also

 List of cities and towns in Utah

References

External links

Towns in Millard County, Utah
Towns in Utah
Populated places established in 1855
1855 establishments in Utah Territory
Great Basin National Heritage Area